

The SITAR GY-90 Mowgli was a light aircraft designed in France in the late 1960s and marketed for homebuilding. Designer Yves Gardan intended it to be a smaller and simpler version of his Bagheera, a conventional low-wing, cantilever monoplane with fixed tricycle undercarriage and a fully enclosed cabin. However, although the Bagheera had seating for up to four people in 2+2 configuration, the Mowgli had no rear seat and could seat only two people, with space behind the seats for luggage. Like the Bagheera, construction was of metal throughout. The Mowgli was designed to use either a 67-kW (90-hp) or 75-kW (100-hp) Continental flat-4 engine.

The Mowgli was available in the form of plans and kits, and plans continued to be available even after SITAR closed in 1972. The first example was expected to fly in 1970.

Specifications (as designed, with 67-kW engine)

Notes

References
 
 
 
 

1970s French civil utility aircraft
SITAR aircraft
Homebuilt aircraft
Single-engined tractor aircraft
Low-wing aircraft